Simon and the Oaks is a Swedish drama film which was released to cinemas in Sweden on 9 December 2011, directed by Lisa Ohlin and starring Bill Skarsgård. The film is based on the novel with the same name by Marianne Fredriksson. The film was nominated in 13 categories at the 47th Guldbagge Awards, won two of the awards: Cecilia Nilsson for Best Actress in a Supporting Role for the role as Inga, and Jan Josef Liefers for Best Actor in a Supporting Role as Ruben Lentov.

Ohlin took over as director for the film, after the director Björn Runge in April 2009 announced that he would drop out of the production. 
In May 2009, the Swedish Film Institute (SFI) announced that Ohlin quits her job as film commissioner at the SFI to direct the film.

Plot 
The film is about Simon (Bill Skarsgård), growing up in a working-class family on the outskirts of Gothenburg during World War II. He is very talented and always felt different and an outsider. Against his parents' approval, he seeks education in the arts, normally not attended by members of the working class at the time. There he meets Isaak (Karl Linnertorp), the son of a wealthy Jewish bookseller who fled persecution in Nazi Germany. The lives of the two boys and their families intertwine as the war rages in Europe. At the end of the war, it becomes clear to Simon that his life, family and his very identity will no longer be the same.

Cast

Accolades
Simon and the Oaks was nominated for 13 Guldbagge Awards, and won two.

References

External links 

 

2010s coming-of-age drama films
2011 films
Films based on Swedish novels
Films directed by Lisa Ohlin
Films set in the 1940s
Films set in Gothenburg
Swedish coming-of-age drama films
Swedish World War II films
2011 drama films
2010s Swedish films